The 1989 Omloop Het Volk was the 43rd edition of the Omloop Het Volk cycle race and was held on 4 March 1989. The race started and finished in Sint-Amandsberg. The race was won by Etienne De Wilde.

General classification

References

1989
Omloop Het Nieuwsblad
Omloop Het Nieuwsblad
March 1989 sports events in Europe